Half-Bridge can refer to: 

 A single-direction configuration of an H-Bridge motor controller
 A form of DC to DC converter switched-mode power supply.
 One of a pair of devices that connect to perform the Bridging (networking) function of a computer network